Cladoceras is a monotypic genus of flowering plants in the family Rubiaceae. The genus contains only one species, viz. Cladoceras subcapitatum, which is endemic to eastern Kenya and Tanzania.

References 

Monotypic Rubiaceae genera
Pavetteae